FC Slobozia Mare  is a Moldovan football club based in Slobozia Mare, Moldova. They play in the Divizia B, the third tier of Moldovan football.

Honours
Divizia B
 Winners (1): 1994–95

External links
Official website
Slobozia mare on Soccerway.com

Football clubs in Moldova
Association football clubs established in 1958
1958 establishments in the Moldavian Soviet Socialist Republic